The Dutch Eerste Divisie in the 1962–63 season was contested by 16 teams. Sittardia won the championship for the second time.

New entrants
Promoted from the 1962–63 Tweede Divisie:
 BVV
 Telstar (formed this season after a merger between VSV and Stormvogels)
Relegated from the 1962–63 Eredivisie:
 De Volewijckers
 Willem II

League standings

See also
 1963–64 Eredivisie
 1963–64 Tweede Divisie

References
Netherlands - List of final tables (RSSSF)

Eerste Divisie seasons
2
Neth